, formerly , is a Christian private university in Sakai, Osaka, Japan.

It is a part of the Momoyama Gakuin (学校法人桃山学院) organization.

Poole Gakuin College received university status in 1995 and the university's first year began in 1996. It had an intercultural studies program as its first four-year program. The Japan University Accreditation Association accredited the university in 2001.

References

External links
 Official website 

Educational institutions established in 1996
Anglican Church in Japan
Private universities and colleges in Japan
Universities and colleges in Osaka Prefecture
1996 establishments in Japan
Sakai, Osaka
Christian universities and colleges in Japan